Päivi Marja Sinikka Tikkanen (née Kunttu; born 19 January 1960 in Savitaipale) is a retired female long-distance runner from Finland, who won the 1989 edition of the Berlin Marathon. A two-time Olympian (1988 and 1992) she ended up in fourth place in the women's 3,000 metres at the 1991 World Championships. Tikkanen was Finnish champion in the same event for ten years in a row (1985–1994). She was coached by her husband Esa Tikkanen.

Achievements

Personal bests
800m 2:06.17 (Varkaus 23.7.1989)
1500m 4:08.46 (Tuusula 22.8.1989)
Mile 4:34.91 (Lohja 8.9.1985)
3000m 8:41.30 (Tokyo 26.8.1991)
5000m 15:15.76 (Lohja 27.8.1989)
10000m 31:45.02 (Helsinki 39.6.1992)
10 km road 33:27 (Jakarta 23.1.1993)
15 km road 52:56 (Adelaide 23.3.1986)
Half marathon 1:10:35 (Stockholm 3.9.1994)
Marathon 2:28:45 (Berlin Marathon 1.10.1989)

External links

http://www.tilastopaja.org/db/fi/atw.php?ID=6123

1960 births
Living people
People from Savitaipale
Finnish female long-distance runners
Athletes (track and field) at the 1988 Summer Olympics
Athletes (track and field) at the 1992 Summer Olympics
Olympic athletes of Finland
Sportspeople from South Karelia